Pagan Babies is an American hardcore punk band from Philadelphia, Pennsylvania. They have been active with their current line-up since January, 2011. The release of Nazi Is Through in February 2019 marked the first recording with their longest-active line-up. Their energy is still on full-display in their live performances playing shows with bands like the Adicts, Slapshot, Alone in a Crowd, Maximum Penalty, Terror, Evacuate, and Ruin, among others.

History 
Founded by Michael J. McManus, vocals and lyrics, Eric Squadroni, lead guitar, Mark Pingitore, bass, Dan McGinnis, rhythm guitar, and Bruce Boyd, drums. From their first practices in the Fall of 1986 to their last shows in the Winter of 1989, the Pagan Babies were an active and influential band in the hardcore/punk community. The Pagan Babies fused hardcore punk, with rap and hip hop. The graffiti styled album art work was created by the drummer Bruce Boyd, and later drummer/DJ for the San Francisco band Grotus. 

In 1987, they recorded their first record titled Immaculate Conception. The eight song 7 inch was released on Positive Force Records.  In 1988, they were signed to Hawker Records, a division of Roadrunner Records, and released their only  full-length album record titled Next. Their songs also appeared on compilation albums.

The original line-up performed its final show in a one time reunion in 2007 along with other Philadelphia punk bands YDI, Flag of Democracy, Decontrol and McRad.
In 2010, they replaced the original drummer (Bruce Boyd) for a promotional show in support of their anthology CD/DVD "LAST" (released on DRP records) which included a documentary film produced and directed by the band's original lead guitar player Eric Squadroni.

Still active with a supportive base, Pagan Babies continues to play numerous shows a year in both support band and a headliner capacity. Notably, they have supported the Adicts, Slapshot, Alone in a Crowd, Maximum Penalty, Terror, Evacuate and Ruin, and co-headlined the 2019 Savage Mountain Punk Festival in Frostburg, Maryland.

Discography 
 2019 – Nazi Is Through (self-released), single
 2019 – My Life (self-released), single
 2010 – Last (DRP Records), anthology CD/DVD
 1988 – Next (Hawker Records), album
 1987 – Wear and Tear (Red Rhino/Cartel, England, 1987), compilation
 1987 – Discpan Hands (Rave Records 1987), compilation of Philadelphia punk bands
 1987 – Immaculate Conception (Positive Force Records 1987), 7" EP

References

External links
 Pagan Babies Bandcamp
 Pagan Babies Merch
 Pagan Babies show review - February 16, 2020
 Nazi Is Through album release review - PunkNews.org - February 11, 2019
 "My Life" song release review - PunkNews.org - February 11, 2019
 Loud! Fast! Philly - Michael McManus Interview
 Loud! Fast! Philly - Mark Pingitore Interview
 Louder, Faster, Harder... Older (2007)

Hardcore punk groups from Pennsylvania